Lavas may refer to

 Lava
Lavaş (lavash) flatbread
Lavaş cheese produced in Turkey
Manne Lavås (born 1944), Swedish speed skater

See also

 Lava (disambiguation)